Jacques Grosperrin (born 17 October 1955 in Baden-Baden) is French politician of The Republicans who has been a member of the Senate since the 2014 elections, representing the Doubs department. Previously he served as a member of the National Assembly of France from 2007 until 2012.

Political positions
In the Republicans’ 2016 presidential primaries, Grosperrin endorsed Jean-François Copé as the party's candidate for the office of President of France.

Other activities
 École nationale d'administration (ENA), Member of the Board of Directors (since 2019)

References

1955 births
Living people
People from Baden-Baden
Union for a Popular Movement politicians
The Republicans (France) politicians
Deputies of the 13th National Assembly of the French Fifth Republic
French Senators of the Fifth Republic
Senators of Doubs
Politicians from Bourgogne-Franche-Comté
Blaise Pascal University alumni